Pithecopus nordestinus is a species of frog in the family Hylidae, endemic to Brazil.

Original description

References

nordestinus
Frogs of South America